Southampton Rangers Sports Club is a Bermudian football club based in the parish of Southampton who participate in the Bermudian First Division.

They play their home games at the Southampton Oval.

History
Founded in the 1950s, the club has won the league title once, in 1981. They only just avoided relegation in the 2013/14 and 2014/15 seasons but were facing the drop once more in the 2015/16 season.

Achievements
Bermudian Premier Division: 1
 1980/81

Bermuda FA Cup: 1
 1983/84

Players

Current squad
 For 2015–2016 season

Historical list of coaches

  Albert Smith
  Gerri Saltus
  Keith Jennings (Jun 2010 – March 2012)
  Marvin Belboda (Jul 2012 – June 2013)
  Maurice Lowe (Jun 2013 – July 2015)
  Keith Jennings (August 2015 – 2016)
  Jomar Wilkinson (July 2017 – present)

References

External links
 Club page – Bermuda FA
Soccerway profile

Football clubs in Bermuda
Southampton Parish, Bermuda